Anton Wembacher (born 15 September 1955) is a German luger. He competed in the men's singles and doubles events at the 1980 Winter Olympics.

References

1955 births
Living people
German male lugers
Olympic lugers of West Germany
Lugers at the 1980 Winter Olympics
People from Berchtesgaden
Sportspeople from Upper Bavaria